Nap Hand is a 1940 comedy play by Vernon Sylvaine and Guy Bolton. The title refers to the sporting term, a nap hand. The farce revolves around quintuplets.

After premiering at the Manchester Opera House, it ran for 83 performances at the Aldwych Theatre in London between 2 March and 11 May 1940. The cast included Ralph Lynn, Kay Walsh, William Hartnell, Marjorie Corbett, Francis de Wolff, Frederick Piper and Bertha Belmore. It was produced by Austin Melford.

References

Bibliography
 Wearing, J.P. The London Stage 1940-1949: A Calendar of Productions, Performers, and Personnel.  Rowman & Littlefield, 2014.

1940 plays
Comedy plays
West End plays
Plays set in England
Plays by Vernon Sylvaine
Plays by Guy Bolton